Fissurellidea megatrema is a species of sea snail, a marine gastropod mollusk in the family Fissurellidae, the keyhole limpets and slit limpets.

Description
The size of the shell varies between 17 mm and 32 mm.

Distribution
This species occurs in the Atlantic Ocean off Brazil, Uruguay, Argentina

References

 Ihering, H. von. 1907. Les Mollusques fossiles du Tertiare et du Crétacé Supérieur de l'Argentine. Anales del Museo Nacional de Buenos Aires (3)7: xiii + 611 pp., 18 pls.

External links
 To Biodiversity Heritage Library (8 publications)
 To Encyclopedia of Life
 To World Register of Marine Species

Fissurellidae
Gastropods described in 1839